Daniel Endres (born 16 May 1985) is a German footballer who plays for Bayern Alzenau.

Career
On 17 June 2019 FC Bayern Alzenau confirmed that they had signed Endres.

References

External links

1985 births
Sportspeople from Offenbach am Main
Footballers from Hesse
Living people
German footballers
Association football goalkeepers
Kickers Offenbach players
FSV Frankfurt players
2. Bundesliga players
3. Liga players
Regionalliga players
Hessenliga players